The Chalmers Medal is the major mid-career award of the Royal Society of Tropical Medicine and Hygiene. The Chalmers Medal was initially awarded biennially, then annually, "in recognition of research of outstanding merit contributing to our knowledge of tropical medicine or tropical hygiene" and now "to researchers in tropical medicine or international health who obtained their last relevant qualification between 15 and 20 years ago, allowing for career breaks, who demonstrate evidence of mentoring and professional development of junior investigators, and other forms of capacity-building in line with Dr Chalmers’ own values". It is named in honour of Dr Albert John Chalmers MD, FRCS, DPH, who was acclaimed for his work on tropical medicine on the Indian sub-continent.

The award was established in 1921 following a donation by Mrs Chalmers, the widow of Dr Chalmers, and consists of a silver gilt medal bearing the image of Dr Chalmers and the society's motto Zonae torridae tutamen (Guardian of the torrid zone) on one side, and  a representation of Anopheles gambiae above a spray of the cinchona plant on the other.

Recipients
Source: RSTMH

See also

 List of medicine awards

References

Medicine awards
British awards
Awards established in 1923
Royal Society of Tropical Medicine and Hygiene